Since the Indian Super League's inaugural season in 2014, 23 players have accrued 100 or more appearances in the Indian Super League. The first player to reach the milestone was defender Mandar Rao Dessai, in representation of Goa and Mumbai City; his 100th match was Mumbai City's 3–0 win over East Bengal on 1 December 2020. Spanish defender Tiri is the first foreign player to make 100 appearances. Sunil Chhetri is the first player to make 100 appearance for a single club with Bengaluru and Edu Bedia is the first foreign player to do so with Goa. Seriton Fernandes and Gurpreet Singh Sandhu are the other players to achieve the feat by playing for a single club.

List of players
Players are initially listed by number of appearances. If number of appearances are equal, the players are then listed chronologically by the year of first appearance. Current Indian Super League players and their current clubs are shown in bold.

Statistics are updated as of 19 January 2023.

Most appearances by club
Current Indian Super League clubs and players who hold the record for the club are shown in bold, defunct clubs are in italics.

As of matches played on 18 January 2023.

See also
List of Indian Super League records and statistics

References

players
Indian Super League players